Elections to the Legislative Assembly of the Indian state of Travancore-Cochin were held on 15 February 1954. 265 candidates competed for the 106 constituencies in the Assembly. There were 11 two-member constituencies and 95 single-member constituencies. Out of these, one single member and one two-member constituency was reserved for SC.  The main contest in the election was between the Indian National Congress (INC) and the United Front of Leftists (UFL). Travancore Tamil Nadu Congress was also significant in some Tamil - significant constituencies.

Results

Summary 

!colspan=10|
|- style="background-color:#E9E9E9; text-align:center;"
! class="unsortable" |
! Political party !! Flag !! Seats  Contested !! Won !! Net Change  in seats !! % of  Seats
! Votes !! Vote % !! Change in vote %
|- style="background: #90EE90;"
| 
| style="text-align:left;" |Indian National Congress
| 
| 115 || 45 ||  1 || 38.46 || 17,62,820 || 45.32 ||  9.88
|-
|-
| 
| style="text-align:left;" |Communist Party of India
| 
| 36 || 23 || New || 19.66 || 6,52,613 || 16.78 || New
|-
| 
| style="text-align:left;" |Praja Socialist Party
|
| 38 || 19 || New || 16.24 || 6,32,623 || 16.26 || New
|-
|
|
| 16 || 12 ||  4 || 10.26 || 2,37,411 || 6.10 ||  0.18
|-
| 
| style="text-align:left;" |Revolutionary Socialist Party
|
| 12 || 9 ||  3 || 7.69 || 212354 || 5.46 ||  1.98
|-
| 
|
| 47 || 9 ||  28 || 7.69 || 3,91,612 || 10.07 || N/A
|- class="unsortable" style="background-color:#E9E9E9"
! colspan = 3|
! style="text-align:center;" |Total seats !! 117 ( 9)!! style="text-align:center;" |Voters !! 52,51,560 !! style="text-align:center;" |Turnout !! colspan = 2|38,89,836 (74.07%)
|}

By constituency

State reorganization and merger
On 1 November 1956, under the States Reorganisation Act, 1956, Kerala was formed by the merger of Travancore-Cochin state with the Malabar district (including Fort Cochin and the Laccadive Islands) of Madras State, Kasaragod taluk of the South Canara district and the Amindive Islands. The southern part of Travancore-Cochin, the five taluks of Agastheeswaram, Thovala, Kalkulam, Vilavahcode and Shencotta, were transferred from Travancore-Cochin to the Madras State. After the reorganization, the assembly constituencies increased from 106 with 117 seats in 1954 to 114 with 126 seats in 1957.

See also

 1954 elections in India
 Travancore-Cochin
 1952 Travancore-Cochin Legislative Assembly election
 1952 Madras Legislative Assembly election in Malabar
 1957 Kerala Legislative Assembly election

References

Travancore
State Assembly elections in Kerala
Travancore–Cochin